Alfred Dorfer (11 October 1961) is an Austrian comedian, writer, and actor. He is one of the most well-known cabaret artists and comedians in Austria, not least due to his commitment to numerous Austrian film productions. After initial success with the group Schlabarett he attained more widespread recognition  as the writer and star (alongside Josef Hader) of the film Indien.

Film 
In 1993 Dorfer appeared alongside Josef Hader in the film Indien under the direction of Paul Harather. A year later came the film  Muttertag (Mother's Day), in which he appeared alongside such other prominent Austrian actors and comedians as Roland Düringer, Andrea Händler and Reinhard Nowak. In 1995 he appeared in Freispiel ("Freegame") under the direction of Harald Sicheritz, once more appearing alongside Roland Düringer.

Television 
From 2004 to 2010 he presented a show on the Austrian channel ORF called Dorfers Donnerstalk on Thursday nights, which was a mix of stand-up comedy, sketches and social commentary.

References

External links 
 Official homepage
 

1961 births
Austrian comedians
Austrian male film actors
Living people
Male actors from Vienna